Isabelle Catherine May "Izzy" Petter (born 27 June 2000) is an English field hockey player who plays as a forward for Loughborough Students and the England and Great Britain national teams.

Club career
Petter plays club hockey in the Women's England Hockey League Premier Division for Loughborough Students.

She previously played for Surbiton.

International career

References

External links

2000 births
Living people
English female field hockey players
Female field hockey forwards
Surbiton Hockey Club players
Women's England Hockey League players
Field hockey players at the 2020 Summer Olympics
Olympic field hockey players of Great Britain
Olympic bronze medallists for Great Britain
Medalists at the 2020 Summer Olympics
Olympic medalists in field hockey
Field hockey players at the 2022 Commonwealth Games
Commonwealth Games gold medallists for England
Commonwealth Games medallists in field hockey
Medallists at the 2022 Commonwealth Games